Derek Pang Wai-cheong  (born 1961) is a Hong Kong judge and has been serving as Justice of Appeal of the Court of Appeal of the High Court of Hong Kong since September 2015.

He is President of the Friends of Scouting of Hong Kong.

Legal career

He was educated at the University of East Anglia (LLB, 1985), the University of Hong Kong (MPA, 1990), and Peking University (LLB, 1995). 

He was called to the English and Hong Kong Bar in 1986 and 1987 respectively. He joined the Hong Kong Legal Department as Crown Counsel in 1987 and was promoted to Deputy Principal Government Counsel in 1997.

Judicial career
In 2000, Pang was appointed a District Judge. He was subsequently appointed a Judge of the Court of First Instance of the High Court in 2009. He was made a Justice of Appeal of the Court of Appeal in 2015.

On 21 September 2018, Pang was elected a Bencher of the Middle Temple.

References

1961 births
Living people
Alumni of the University of East Anglia
Alumni of the University of Hong Kong
Peking University alumni
Hong Kong judges